Melissa Holt (born 11 December 1976) is a racing cyclist from New Zealand. She competed in the women's individual road race at the 2004 Summer Olympics.

References

External links

1976 births
Living people
New Zealand female cyclists
Cyclists at the 2010 Commonwealth Games
Sportspeople from Napier, New Zealand
Olympic cyclists of New Zealand
Cyclists at the 2004 Summer Olympics
Commonwealth Games competitors for New Zealand
21st-century New Zealand women